Angelica M. Jimenez (born March 19, 1965) is an American Democratic Party politician, who has been serving in the New Jersey General Assembly since 2012, where she represents the 32nd Legislative District. Jimenez has been the Deputy Speaker in the General Assembly since 2020.

She has served on the West New York Housing Corporation Board since 2010 and was Vice Chair of the West New York Housing Authority, from 2008 to 2010. Jimenez has served on the New Jersey Democratic State Committee since 2008 and was Vice President of the Board of Education of the West New York School District from 2009 until 2011. She is a state-certified radiology technician.

Elective office
Jimenez was chosen to run for office in the General Assembly after Joan M. Quigley announced that she would not run for re-election in the face of redistricting.

Committees 
Committee assignments for the current session are:
Human Services, Chair
Housing, Vice-chair
Health

District 32 
Each of the 40 districts in the New Jersey Legislature has one representative in the New Jersey Senate and two members in the New Jersey General Assembly.Each of the 40 districts in the New Jersey Legislature has one representative in the New Jersey Senate and two members in the New Jersey General Assembly. Representatives from the 32nd District for the 2022—2023 Legislative Session are:
Senator Nicholas Sacco
Assemblyman Pedro Mejia
Assemblywoman Angelica M. Jimenez

References

External links
Assemblywoman Jimenez's legislative web page, New Jersey Legislature
New Jersey Legislature financial disclosure forms - 2011

1965 births
Living people
Democratic Party members of the New Jersey General Assembly
Hispanic and Latino American state legislators in New Jersey
Hispanic and Latino American women in politics
People from West New York, New Jersey
21st-century American politicians
21st-century American women